The Neptune was an 80-gun Bucentaure-class 80-gun ship of the line of the French Navy, designed by Sané.

Started in 1810, briefly renamed Brabançon during the Hundred Days and launched in 1818, after the Bourbon Restoration, she remained without commission until 1839.

She was part of a squadron under Admiral Hugon, along with Montebello and Andromaque.

She was struck in 1858 and used as a prison ship in Toulon harbour between 1865 and 1868.

References
 Jean-Michel Roche, Dictionnaire des Bâtiments de la flotte de guerre française de Colbert à nos jours, tome I

Ships of the line of the French Navy
Ships built in France
Bucentaure-class ships of the line
1818 ships